Rósa Guðmundsdóttir (1795–1855), was an Icelandic poet. She belonged to the most known poets in Iceland of her time and is the author of many well known folk songs and poems in Icelandic. 

Björk performed Guðmundsdóttir's song Vísur Vatnsenda-Rósu in 1994 for the album Chansons des mers froides.

References

Rosa Gudmundsdottir
Rosa Gud
Rosa Gud
1795 births
1855 deaths
19th-century Icelandic poets
19th-century Icelandic women writers
19th-century Icelandic writers